Altica lythri is a species of flea beetle from the leaf beetle family, that is common in Asia, Europe, and North Africa, including Israel. They present an ovipositor during oviposition. The species is distributed in European countries such as Finland and Ukraine, to the Asian countries of Azerbaijan, Dagestan, and Turkey. The species hibernate in winter, and come aground during summer months, when they are hungry. They feed on leaves of willowherb, water primroses and sallows. The species could become victims of such predators as Braconidae, Ichneumonidae, and adults of Pentatomidae, especially Zicrona caerulea.

References

Further reading
 For a description of the larvae: 

Beetles described in 1843
Alticini
Taxa named by Charles Nicholas Aubé